The Newport Review and Monmouthshire Register was a 19th-century Welsh periodical, first published by Samuel Etheridge in Newport in 1822. It contained mainly political (often radical) articles. Samuel Etheridge was the magazine's editor, and John Frost (1784-1877) (the future Chartist leader, influential in the Chartist uprising in Newport in 1839) was an early contributor. Along with John Frost's The Welchman, the radical political views shared in this periodical contributed to the tension which lead to the Newport Uprising.

References 

Periodicals published in Wales
Magazines published in Wales
Political magazines published in the United Kingdom